The 2001 Croatia Open was amen's  tennis tournament played on outdoor clay courts at the ITC Stella Maris in Umag in Croatia and was part of the International Series of the 2001 ATP Tour. The tournament ran from 16 July through 22 July 2001.

Finals

Singles

 Carlos Moyá defeated  Jérôme Golmard 6–4, 3–6, 7–6(7–2)
 It was Moyá's only title of the year and the 7th of his career.

Doubles

 Sergio Roitman /  Andrés Schneiter defeated  Ivan Ljubičić /  Lovro Zovko 6–2, 7–5
 It was Roitman's only title of the year and the 2nd of his career. It was Schneiter's only title of the year and the 2nd of his career.

See also
 2001 Croatian Bol Ladies Open

References

External links
 Official website 
 ATP Tournament Profile

Croatia Open
Croatia Open
2001 in Croatian tennis